Chame Airport (LID: MP24) is an airport serving  Chame District, a district in the Panamá Oeste Province of Panama.

There is distant rising terrain to the north.

History
During World War II the facility was used as an auxiliary military airfield (Chame Airdrome, Chame Airfield #1) of Howard Field as part of the defense of the Panama Canal. Assigned units were the USAAF 53d Fighter Group, 14th Fighter Squadron (2 January-24 November 1942) and 28th Fighter Squadron (10 November 1942 – 25 September 1945) flying P-39 Airacobras, AT-6, BT-13, and UC-78s.

See also
Transport in Panama
List of airports in Panama

References

External links
OpenStreetMap - Chame
OurAirports - Chame
FallingRain - Chame Airport

Airfields of the United States Army Air Forces in Panama
Airports in Panama